Denis Robin (born 27 June 1979 in Angers) is a French former road racing cyclist.

Major results
2004
2nd Classic Loire Atlantique
2005
2nd Bordeaux-Saintes
2006
2nd Duo Normand (with Cédric Coutouly)
2007
2nd Duo Normand (with Émilien-Benoît Bergès)

References

External links

1979 births
Living people
French male cyclists
Sportspeople from Angers
Cyclists from Pays de la Loire